Phanogomphus quadricolor, the rapids clubtail,  is a species of dragonfly in the family Gomphidae. It is found in eastern North America. Its natural habitat is medium to large rivers. It is threatened by degrading habitat quality.

This is a small dragonfly:  in length. Adults have bluish-green eyes on a yellowish-green face. The body has brownish-black and yellowish-green stripes and its wings are transparent.

Adults feed on small flying insects.

The aquatic larvae hatch in slow-moving pools.

Phanogomphus quadricolor was recently considered a member of the genus Gomphus, but in 2017 it became a member of the genus Phanogomphus when Phanogomphus was elevated from subgenus to genus rank.

References

  
 
 

Gomphidae
Insects described in 1863
Taxa named by Benjamin Dann Walsh